Kale Clague (born June 5, 1998) is a Canadian professional ice hockey defenceman currently playing for the  Buffalo Sabres of the National Hockey League (NHL). He was selected by the Los Angeles Kings in the second round, 51st overall, of the 2016 NHL Entry Draft.

Early life
Clague was born on June 5, 1998, in Regina, Saskatchewan, Canada to parents Jason and Juanita. His father was a goaltender for the 2000-2001 Lloydminster Border Kings which was inducted into the Saskatchewan Hockey Hall of Fame. His uncle Trevor Hanas is also involved in ice hockey; he played five seasons in the Western Hockey League (WHL) before a brief minor professional career. Growing up, he attended Holy Rosary High School and won the Brick Invitational Hockey Tournament.

Playing career
Growing up in Alberta, Clague played both ice hockey and baseball. He helped the Lloydminster Twins Peewee AA team win the Western Canadian Baseball Championship in 2010 and won the Alberta Peewee Provincial Championship. During his bantam career, Clague established a new scoring record for defencemen in the provinces bantam AAA ranks with 35 goals and 77 points in 33 games. His scoring record surpassed former Toronto Maple Leafs captain Dion Phaneuf who had 65 points. He was subsequently named to the AMHL First All-Star Team in 2013–14 and captained Alberta to a gold medal at the 2013 Western Canada U16 Challenge Cup. During this time, Clague was drafted sixth overall of the Brandon Wheat Kings in the 2013 Western Hockey League Bantam Draft.

Major junior
Clague competed in four pre-season games with the Wheat Kings during their 2013–14 season, where he recorded two goals and five points, before being returned to the Alberta Midget Hockey League. He eventually rejoined the WHL to compete with the Wheat Kings in the 2014 WHL Playoffs. At the age of 16, Clague made his rookie season debut with the Wheat Kings but a series of injuries limited him to 20 games. When reflecting on the year, Clague said "It was hard to overcome those injuries and it sucked to sit out all those games. But I worked hard with our trainer in Brandon and got healthy again and ready for this [2015–16] year."

Following his disappointing rookie season, Clague increased his offensive output and recorded 43 points in 71 regular-season games and played in the 2016 CHL/NHL Top Prospects Game. By the conclusion of the playoffs, he tied for second among WHL defensemen in scoring with 14 points in 21 games. As a result, Clague was drafted in the second round, 51st overall, by the Los Angeles Kings in the 2016 NHL Entry Draft. He joined the Kings for their 2016 development camp but suffered a leg injury and was forced to leave early. The injury came when an Arizona Coyotes prospect hit him and he fell awkwardly into the end boards. Upon returning to the WHL, Clague was named one of the Wheat Kings alternate captains for the 2016–17 season.

Clague began his final full season with the Wheat Kings by earning WHL Player of the Week for the week ending October 23, 2016. The honour came after he registered six points in his first two games of the season following his leg injury. As a result of his play during the remainder of the season, Clague signed a three-year entry-level contract with the Kings on March 6, 2017. At the time of the signing, he led team defenseman in points and assists and ranked second in goals with five. Following this, he was also named an WHL Eastern Conference First Team All-Star.

During the 2017 offseason, Clague was again invited to participate in the Los Angeles Kings' rookie and training camp. While with the Kings, he participated in two preseason games against the Anaheim Ducks and Vegas Golden Knights. By January, Clague had recorded 47 points in 28 games tying defenceman David Quenneville for the league scoring lead among defenceman. On January 17, leading up to the 2018 WHL Trade Deadline, Clague was traded to the Moose Jaw Warriors in exchange for Luka Burzan, Chase Hartje, a second-round pick in the 2018 WHL Bantam Draft, and first-round picks in the 2019 and 2021 drafts.

Professional
Clague made his NHL debut with the Los Angeles Kings on December 21, 2019, against the Buffalo Sabres. From there, he appeared in three more games during his first NHL call-up where he averaged 14:34 time on ice per game. Upon returning to the AHL, Clague was named to the 2020 AHL All-Star Game for the first time. At the time of his selection, he led team defensemen in points with 16 in 33 games.

When the NHL resumed playing for the 2020–21 season, Clague was named to the Kings' opening night roster. On August 6, 2021, Clague signed a one-year extension with the Kings  worth an annual value of $761,250 at the NHL level.

In the following 2021–22 season, Clague was assigned by Los Angeles to begin the year in the AHL with the Ontario Reign. On dual recalls to the Kings, Clague registered 5 assists through 11 games before he was placed on waivers and claimed by the Montreal Canadiens on December 4, 2021.

As a free agent from the Canadiens, Clague was signed by the Buffalo Sabres on a one-year, two-way contract on July 13, 2022.

International play

Clague competed in the 2014 World Under-17 Hockey Challenge for Team Black, recording one goal in four games. He later won gold with Canada at the 2015 Ivan Hlinka Memorial Tournament, where he scored one goal in four games. Clague returned to Team Canada in 2017 as an assistant captain to help them win a silver medal at the 2017 World Junior Ice Hockey Championships.

In his final year qualifying for the World Junior Ice Hockey Championships, Clague was again selected to compete with Canada where he won a gold medal.

Player profile

Prior to becoming a professional ice hockey player, Clague described himself as "an offensive defenseman who sees the ice well and someone who works hard at defending in my own end." Leading up to the 2016 NHL Entry Draft, scout John Williams described him as "an excellent skater" who "has excellent vision when moving the puck, makes a solid first pass out of the zone and is a composed player who makes good choices under pressure." Clague has compared his playing style to that of Drew Doughty.

Career statistics

Regular season and playoffs

International

References

External links

1998 births
Living people
Brandon Wheat Kings players
Buffalo Sabres players
Canadian ice hockey defencemen
Ice hockey people from Saskatchewan
Los Angeles Kings draft picks
Los Angeles Kings players
Montreal Canadiens players
Moose Jaw Warriors players
Ontario Reign (AHL) players
Rochester Americans players
Sportspeople from Regina, Saskatchewan